This is a list of newspapers in the Bahamas.

Newspapers 
Abaconian, Marsh Harbour, Abaco
The Bahama Journal - Nassau, New Providence
Bahamas National
Bahamas News Ma Bey, founded in 2009, headquarters located in Orlando, Florida
Bahamas Press
Bahamas Spectator
Bahamas Uncensored
Bahamas Weekly
Eleutheran, Eleuthera
The Freeport News - Freeport, Grand Bahama Island
The Nassau Guardian - Nassau, New Providence
Official Gazette The Bahamas, founded in 1783, official newspaper of the Bahamas' government
The Punch - Nassau, New Providence
The Tribune - Nassau, New Providence

See also
Television in the Bahamas

References 

Bahamas
Newspapers